Morozovsky (masculine), Morozovskaya (feminine), or Morozovskoye (neuter) may refer to:
Morozovsky District, a district of Rostov Oblast, Russia
Morozovskoye Urban Settlement, several municipal urban settlements in Russia
Morozovsky (rural locality) (Morozovskaya, Morozovskoye), several rural localities in Russia

See also
Moroz (disambiguation)
Morozov (disambiguation)
Morozovsk
Elena Mrozovskaya, Russian photographer